Chen Wu (born November 1954) is a Chinese politician currently serving as deputy director of the Financial and Economic Committee of the National People's Congress. Previously He served as the Chairman (Governor) and Deputy Communist Party Chief of Guangxi Autonomous Region. He is a member of the Zhuang minority.

Career
Chen Wu is a native of Chongzuo, Guangxi. He entered the work force in October 1972, working at a rice factory in Nanning, the capital of Guangxi.  He joined the Chinese Communist Party in February 1975.  Chen entered Guangxi University in January 1978, earning a bachelor's degree in philosophy in 1982.

After university Chen spent his entire career working for the government of Guangxi.  In December 2005 he was promoted to be the Vice Chairman of Guangxi, and in September 2011 he became the Communist Party Chief of the regional capital Nanning.  In March 2013 Chen Wu was appointed Acting Chairman and Deputy Communist Party Chief of Guangxi, and was made Chairman the following month. On November 11, 2020, he was appointed deputy director of the Financial and Economic Committee of the National People's Congress. 

Chen is an alternate member of the 18th Central Committee of the Chinese Communist Party.

References 

Living people
1954 births
Chinese Communist Party politicians from Guangxi
People's Republic of China politicians from Guangxi
Political office-holders in Guangxi
People from Chongzuo
Guangxi University alumni
Delegates to the 11th National People's Congress
Alternate members of the 18th Central Committee of the Chinese Communist Party
Members of the 18th Central Committee of the Chinese Communist Party
Members of the 19th Central Committee of the Chinese Communist Party